Return to Cabin by the Lake is a 2001 American crime comedy telefilm, starring Judd Nelson. It was directed by Po-Chih Leong. The movie is a sequel to Cabin by the Lake.

Plot
Two years after being presumed dead, Stanley Caldwell (under the alias of "Alan") meets with an agent named Lauren on a boat to discuss a new screenplay. They soon learn that despite public protest, director Mike Helton has begun principal photography on Cabin by the Lake, a film based on Stanley's old screenplay detailing his exploits as a serial killer. Amongst the protesters is Paul Parsons, the brother of Kimberly Parsons who was one of Stanley's last victims. When Lauren confesses to hiring someone to rewrite his screenplay, Stanley binds her to a cement flower pot. A horrified Lauren realizes Alan's true identity and desperately suggests that he become a director. Stanley is intrigued by the idea, but nevertheless pushes her overboard to drown.

On the set of the film, Paul Parsons confronts Mike Helton and demands that he cease the production, but is dragged away by security.  Stanley then arrives in disguise, claiming that he owns the cabin where the film is being shot, in fact the actual cabin where he had lived two years prior.  While wandering the set, he bumps into screenwriter Alison Gaddis, who praises Stanley's work and is curious about his background.

Helton receives a call from JC Reddick, the producer's nephew and second unit director whom no one has ever met.  Helton tells him he will send a plane for him at the airport. Stanley leaves the set and races to the airport while donning a new disguise. There, Stanley retrieves JC, then drugs and kills him on the lake. Posing as JC himself, Stanley returns to the set and once again runs into Alison. He claims to be acquainted with Stanley and gives her several details about him, mentioning his preference for strong women as victims. She explains her fascination with Stanley as a film student and invites him out for coffee at a later date, which Stanley accepts.

Helton unveils the indoor set for Cabin by the Lake: An enormous water tank almost identical to Stanley's original "garden". Tasked with shooting the underwater scenes, Stanley dons scuba gear and dives into the tank to tend his garden, infuriating Helton by ignoring his stage directions. Later, Stanley and Alison finally meet to discuss Stanley more in depth.  When she mentions Kimberly Parsons, Stanley describes how she had fought the hardest of all his victims, remembering vividly how she had scratched and clawed him.

When Alison returns to the tank alone to continue writing, she is ambushed by an unknown person. Helton believes that Paul Parsons is responsible, in an effort to sabotage the production. Helton then discovers that Stanley has made changes to the script without his knowledge, further angering him.  In turn, Stanley drugs Helton and takes him back to the cabin where he buries him alive, using fireworks to cover his panicked screams.

Stanley takes over as director, micromanaging every aspect of the film.  At the lake, Paul confronts Alison about her part in the production. He apologizes for scaring her at the tank and invites her to meet him at the bar to discuss his sister. Paul gives details of Kimberly's death that eerily correspond with those from Stanley himself, rousing Alison's suspicions. When she confronts Stanley, he gives her a drugged glass of wine that renders her unconscious. She awakens in Stanley's cabin basement, chained to the floor by her ankle just like all his previous victims. As he greets her with food, the scars on his forearm confirm his identity.

Paul repeatedly calls the set looking for Alison, but is told that she finished rewriting the script and went home.  Stanley then falsely informs Paul that he is planning to scrap the production and invites Paul to meet him at the stage that night. Stanley directs the final scene of the movie, but secretly rigs a light fixture to fall into the tank and electrocute the actress inside. When Paul arrives on set just afterwards, Stanley frames him for the incident and sends him fleeing.

Stanley coerces the actors playing Mallory and Boone to come back to the set for one final shot, then returns to the cabin where a defiant Alison manipulates him into bringing her to the stage. She tries to warn the two actors that Stanley is planning to kill them, but to no avail. While looking for Alison, Paul discovers she was abducted by Stanley.

Holding them at gunpoint, Stanley carries out his plan to drown Mallory's actress. As the actor playing Boone struggles to free her, Alison pushes Stanley off the platform before shooting the tank with Stanley's gun, flooding the stage.  Paul returns to help, but Alison is recaptured by Stanley and forced into his car. While driving, Alison deliberately crashes the car and escapes, but Stanley recovers and pursues her back to the cabin.

Stanley finds her hiding in the bathroom, but Alison strikes him with a towel rack and knocks him into a bathtub full of water. After a brief standoff, she throws a hair dryer into the tub and electrocutes him. The police arrive with Paul but a search of the cabin yields no sign of Stanley. They find his boat on the lake, and Alison finds a watch he had stolen from JC on the dock. The police decide they will drag the lake tomorrow and try to reassure Alison that Stanley is dead.

A news report states that Cabin by the Lake was a surprise hit in its opening weekend, earning $36 million at the box office with a sequel already in the works. Alison and Paul have since started a relationship, but Alison still has nightmares about Stanley, who is shown reading the newspaper article about the film's success.

Cast
 Judd Nelson as Stanley Caldwell
 Brian Krause as Mike Helton
 Dahlia Salem as Alison Gaddis
 Claudette Mink as Lauren Majors
 Kandyse McClure as Jade
 Emmanuelle Vaugier as Vicki
 JR Bourne as JC Reddick
 Will Sanderson as Chad

Reception
Michael Speier from Variety gave the movie a good review, stating: "USA’s “Return to Cabin by the Lake” is nothing like its predecessor — and that's a good thing. Campy to the max, this sequel to last year's highly rated telepic does away with the original's misogyny and replaces it with in-jokes about the Hollywood production process. Completely in tune with just how flaky showbiz types can be, this serial killer story is comfortable in the confines of feather-light, jokey fright".

References

External links
 
 

2000 films
Television sequel films
USA Network original films
Original Film films
2000s English-language films